Dara Singh Chauhan (born 25 July 1963) is an Indian politician who represented Madhuban (Assembly constituency) in Uttar Pradesh as a member of Samajwadi party. .
He was former Cabinet Minister in Yogi Adityanath ministry. He also represented Ghosi in the 15th Lok Sabha, where he was leader of the Bahujan Samaj Party. In 16th Lok Sabha, he was defeated by Harinarayan Rajbhar who represented Bharatiya Janata Party by more than 140,000 votes.

On 2 February 2015, he joined Bharatiya Janata Party in presence of party president Amit Shah in New Delhi.

Soon after he joined BJP, he was made BJP Chauhan Morcha President and given the ticket to fight the MLA Election from Madhuban Constituency, where many people were rallying to get BJP ticket. He won election from Madhuban Constituency by more than 30,000 votes and was able to grow saffron for first time in this constituency and become cabinet minister in U.P. government.

Early life and education
Chauhan was born 25 July 1963 in Galvara village of Azamgarh district to his father Ram Kishan Chauhan. He married Disha Chauhan, they have two sons and two daughters. In 1980, he attended the Madhyamik Shikasha Parishad Allahabad and attained High School education. He is a senior backward caste politician, prominent in OBC politics in Uttar Pradesh.

Political career 
Chauhan started his political career from Bahujan Samaj Party. He became Rajya sabha member for first time in 1996 and second time in 2000. He won 2009 Indian general election from Ghosi Loksabha as a candidate of Bahujan Samaj Party. In 2015, he joined Bharatiya Janata Party, and fought 2017 Uttar Pradesh Legislative Assembly election from Madhuban Vidhansabha. After election he became Minister of Forest, Environment and Zoological Garden in Government of Uttar Pradesh. On 12 Jan. 2022, he resigned from BJP and its ministry as he was well aware that he wouldn't get ticket from BJP to fight election due to his non-performance. He joined Samajwadi Party.

Posts held 
1996-2000 Member of Parliament in Rajya Sabha
1998-1999 Member, Committee on Petroleum and Natural Gas
1998-2001 Member, Consultative Committee, Ministry of Coal
2000-2006 Member of Parliament in Rajya Sabha (2nd term)
2000-2004 Member, Committee on Energy
2002-2004 Member, Consultative Committee, Ministry of Coal and Mines
2004-2005 Member, Committee on Transport, Tourism and Culture
2004 Member, Committee on Members of Parliament Local Area Development Scheme (Rajya Sabha)
2004 Member, Consultative Committee, Ministry of Defence
2005 Member, Committee on Energy
2009-2014 Member of Parliament in 15th Lok Sabha
Leader, Bahujan Samaj Parliamentary Party,  Lok Sabha
2009 Member, Business Advisory Committee
2009 Member, Committee on Installation of Portraits/Statues of National Leaders and Parliamentarians in Parliament House Complex
2009 Chairman, Committee on Social Justice and Empowerment
2009 Member, Committee on Security in Parliament Complex
2009 Member, Committee on Government Assurances
2009 Member, General Purposes Committee
2009 Member,  Joint Committee on Office of Profit
2017-Incumbent MLA in 17th Legislative Assembly of Uttar Pradesh
2017-2022 Minister of Forest and Environment in Yogi Adityanath ministry

References

1963 births
Living people
Lok Sabha members from Uttar Pradesh
Politicians from Azamgarh district
India MPs 2009–2014
Uttar Pradesh MLAs 2017–2022
Bahujan Samaj Party candidates in the 2014 Indian general election
Bahujan Samaj Party politicians from Uttar Pradesh
Bharatiya Janata Party politicians from Uttar Pradesh
State cabinet ministers of Uttar Pradesh
Yogi ministry
Samajwadi Party politicians from Uttar Pradesh
Uttar Pradesh MLAs 2022–2027